The Parliament 1634–1635 was the first of the two Irish parliaments of Charles I. The main purpose was to raise money by taxation and to ratify the Graces, a series of concessions to Irish Catholic landowners. Six years of taxes were voted, but few of the graces were ratified.

Background 

Charles I, king of England, Scotland and Ireland, summoned the Irish Parliament of 1634–1635 to put the Irish government on a sound financial footing. The preceding parliament had been the Parliament of 1613–1615, the only Irish parliament of James I. In this parliament James I had created more than 30 pocket boroughs under Protestant control. The Irish House of Commons of 1634 therefore had 254 members: 112 Catholic and 142 Protestant. In 1632 Charles I had appointed Thomas Wentworth (the future Earl of Strafford) as his Lord Deputy of Ireland. Wentworth had taken office in July 1633.

Proceedings 

During the parliament the King stayed in England and was represented at the parliament in Dublin by his Lord Deputy. Parliament was opened on 14 July 1634 at Dublin Castle by the Lord Deputy. Nathaniel Catelyn, one of the two members for Dublin City, was elected speaker.

Taxation 

Wentworth insisted that subsidies needed to be attended to first. Six subsidies of £50,000 (about £ in ) each, or according to another source £240,000 (about £ in ) altogether, were voted by the Commons unanimously on 19 July 1634. These subsidies were approved by the Lords on 2 August, when the 1st session was closed and prorogued to the 4 November by the Lord Deputy.

The Graces 

King Charles I had indicated in 1626 that he would concede certain rights to the Irish Catholics if paid well enough. These concessions are known as the Graces. At Whitehall in 1628 the King and a delegation of Irish noblemen had agreed on 51 articles. At the core of the Graces were land rights and religious freedom. The payment had been fixed at £120,000 sterling (about £ in ) in three yearly instalments. The Irish Parliament should have confirmed the Graces promptly, but the then Lord Deputy, Lord Falkland, had never summoned that parliament. The parliament for which was summoned in 1634 was the first Irish parliament since the proclamation of the Graces. Irish Catholics, therefore, expected to see them confirmed in this parliament while Wentworth expected trouble when he refused.

The ratification of the Graces was tabled afterwards. Of the 51 articles Wentworth let 10 be voted into law, the others would be left at the discretion of the government, except articles 24 and 25, concerning land tenure, which he rejected. The Catholic MPs felt that the King had cheated them.

Other Laws 

The Catholic MPs expressed their anger by voting against any law later proposed by Wentworth and due to absenteeism among the Protestant MPs, the Catholics were able to vote several laws down. The government recalled the absent Protestant MPs, and the laws passed. Wentworth dissolved parliament on 18 April 1635.

See also 

 List of Acts of the Parliament of Ireland to 1700
 List of parliaments of Ireland

Notes, citations, and sources

Notes

Citations

Sources 

 – 1603 to 1642
 – 1613 to 1641
 – 1624 to 1632

 – 1603 to 1607
 – 1635 to 1639

 – 1634 to 1699

 – Snippet view
 – House of Lords

Irish MPs 1634–1635
1965 disestablishments in Ireland
Parliament of Ireland
Charles I of England